Michelle Drayne (born 22 September 1988) is a Northern Ireland netball international and a former Antrim ladies' Gaelic footballer. She represented Northern Ireland at the 2014 and 2018 Commonwealth Games and at the 2019 Netball World Cup. She was also a member of the Northern Ireland team that were silver medallists at the 2012 and 2017 European Netball Championships. Drayne has also played in the Netball Superleague for Team Northumbria, Saracens Mavericks and London Pulse.

Early life, family and education
Drayne is from Lisburn, County Antrim. She is the daughter of Michael and Stella Drayne. She has four siblings Niamh, Maeve, Owen and Aideen. Her mother, Stella Drayne, is a former netball coach/team manager with both Larkfield and Northern Ireland under-21 teams. She has coached teams that have included her daughter. Michael Drayne is a dairy farmer and a partner in the family firm, Draynes Farm. Michael and Stella Drayne have also fronted various sports sponsorships on behalf of Draynes Farm. These include Lisburn's Sports Personality of the Year Awards. Draynes Farm also helped sponsor the Northern Ireland team at the 2017 Netball World Youth Cup. Drayne was educated at St. Joseph's Primary School in Lisburn  and at
Rathmore Grammar School. Between 2007 and 2010 she attended Loughborough University where she gained a BSc in Sports Science and Management and an M.Ed./PGCE in Physical Education.

Netball

Clubs

Larkfield
Drayne played netball for the Lisburn–based Larkfield club in the Northern Ireland Premier League. Her teammates at Larkfield included fellow Northern Ireland internationals, Neamh Woods and Caroline O'Hanlon.

New Cambell
Drayne has also played for Dagenham-based New Cambell in the London & South-East Region Senior League.

Team Northumbria
As part of their preparations for the 2014 Commonwealth Games, the Northern Ireland national netball team formed a partnership with Team Northumbria. This saw Drayne and six other Northern Ireland internationals – Oonagh McCullough, Noleen Lennon, Caroline O'Hanlon, Gemma Gibney, Fionnuala Toner and Niamh Cooper – play for Team Northumbria during the 2014 Netball Superleague season.

Hertfordshire Mavericks
Between 2015 and 2019, Drayne played for Hertfordshire Mavericks in the Netball Superleague. Her teammates at Mavericks have included Lindsay Keable.

London Pulse
Drayne will play for London Pulse during the 2020 Netball Superleague season.

Northern Ireland
Drayne represented Northern Ireland at under-17, under-19 and under-21 levels. She made her senior debut for Northern Ireland in 2008. She has subsequently represented Northern Ireland at the 2014 and 2018 Commonwealth Games and at the 2019 Netball World Cup. She was also a member of the Northern Ireland teams that won the 2015 Nations Cup and silver medals at the 2012 and 2017 European Netball Championships. Drayne is one of several Ladies' Gaelic footballers to play netball for Northern Ireland. Others include Caroline O'Hanlon (Armagh), Neamh Woods (Tyrone) and Emma and Michelle Magee (Antrim).

Gaelic football

Clubs
Drayne has played ladies' Gaelic football at club level for St. Gall's. In 2010 she helped St. Gall's win the Ulster Intermediate Club Ladies Football Championship and was named player of the match in the final

Inter-county
Drayne also represented Antrim in the All-Ireland Junior Ladies' Football Championship.

Schoolteacher
Between July 2011 and July 2015 Drayne worked as a PE teacher at St Martin's School, Brentwood. Since September 2015, she has served as Head of Netball at New Hall School.

Honours
Northern Ireland
Nations Cup
Winners: 2015: 1 
European Netball Championship
Runner up: 2012, 2017: 2

References

1988 births
Living people
Northern Ireland netball internationals
Netball players at the 2014 Commonwealth Games
Netball players at the 2018 Commonwealth Games
Commonwealth Games competitors for Northern Ireland
2019 Netball World Cup players
Netball Superleague players
Team Northumbria netball players
Mavericks netball players
London Pulse players
St Gall's Gaelic footballers
Antrim ladies' Gaelic footballers
Sportspeople from Lisburn
Irish expatriate sportspeople in England
Schoolteachers from Northern Ireland
People educated at Rathmore Grammar School
Alumni of Loughborough University